The Izmaragd (from ) is an Old East Slavic moral compilation work, surviving in a number of manuscript copies. Written in codex form, the earliest written copy is from the 14th century. Depending on the version, it contains from 90 to 250 articles, mostly translated from Greek and adapted to Rus' culture and context.

The themes covered by the work are various: "revering books", Christian virtues and sins, good and mean wives, education of children and household management. The Izmaragd was widely in use until the end of 17th century (20th century in some Old Believers communities), and heavily contributed to the influence of Domostroy in 15th-16th centuries.

References 
 Great Soviet Encyclopedia

East Slavic manuscripts
East Slavic literature